Lin Wen-tang  (born 28 June 1974) is a Taiwanese professional golfer. He comes from a golfing family, with his father and uncle both being professionals and two brothers who played with him on the Asian Tour.

Lin turned professional in 1996, and won for the first time as at the 1998 Hsin Fong Open, a non-tour event in his home country. He has played on the Asian Tour since 1998 and has won four titles, his first coming in 2006 at the Taiwan Open. His second Asian Tour victory came in 2007 at the Brunei Open, and in 2008 he won the inaugural Asian Tour International in Thailand.

In April 2008, Lin reached the top 100 of the Official World Golf Rankings, and then in November, he recorded the biggest win of his career at the UBS Hong Kong Open, a European Tour co-sanctioned event, defeating Rory McIlroy and Francesco Molinari in a playoff. The win earned Lin a two-year exemption on the European Tour. He finished 2008 in the world top 50 to qualify for the 2009 Masters.

Professional wins (10)

European Tour wins (1)

1Co-sanctioned by the Asian Tour

European Tour playoff record (1–0)

Asian Tour wins (6)

1Co-sanctioned by the European Tour

Asian Tour playoff record (1–2)

Asian Development Tour wins (2)

1Co-sanctioned by the Taiwan PGA Tour

Other wins (2)
1998 Hsin Fong Open
2004 ROC PGA Championship

Results in major championships

CUT = missed the halfway cut
Note: Lin only played in the Masters Tournament.

Results in World Golf Championships

QF, R16, R32, R64 = Round in which player lost in match play
"T" = Tied

Team appearances
Amateur
Eisenhower Trophy (representing Taiwan): 1992

Professional
World Cup (representing Taiwan): 2008, 2009

See also
List of golfers with most Asian Tour wins

References

External links

Taiwanese male golfers
Asian Tour golfers
Olympic golfers of Taiwan
Golfers at the 2016 Summer Olympics
People from Hsinchu
1974 births
Living people